Chandrapura Junction railway station is a railway junction  station at the junction of Gomoh–Barkakana branch line and Chandrapura–Muri branch line mainly a part of Railways in Jharia Coalfield. It is located in Bokaro district in the Indian state of Jharkhand.

History
In 1913, Chandrapura was connected to Mahuda and merged to Gomoh–Mahuda–Adra–Kharagpur (BNR) line and then became a Railways in Jharia Coalfield.
In 1927, the Central India Coalfields Railway opened the Gomoh–Barkakana line.  Later, the line was amalgamated with East Indian Railway.

Electrification
Railway lines in the Chandrapura  area (including Bokaro Steel City Yard) were electrified in 1986–89.

References

External links
  Trains at Chandrapura

Railway stations in Bokaro district
Dhanbad railway division